Ommidion mirim is a species of beetle in the family Cerambycidae. It was first described by Martins in 1998.

References

Phlyctaenodini